Jagaba Hamza  Auta (born 5 November 1994 ) is a Nigerian footballer who last played as a forward for Lonestar Kashmir FC in the Indian I-League 2nd Division. Hamza has been the highest goal scorer for his team both in BEML SC and HAL. He has played in the Indian I-League with HAL and Salgaocar. His highest scoring league seasons so far have seen him score 12 goals in the 2016-17 Indian I-League.

Career

Early career
Hamza joined the local football club First Bank FC, having been scouted by his local manager Awwal Bello Arab while playing on the streets of his hometown in Lagos. After a year with the club, he moved to FC Dragons in Benin Republic and was loan to play in Tunisia in the northern Africa. In the year 2012 Hamza moved back to Nigeria and signed for Adamawa United in the Nigerian Professional League, Hamza was loan out of Africa to India and played for BEML Sport Club, HAL Sport Club, "Al Hamriyah SC" in Dubai UAE and Salgaocar Sport Club in the Indian I-League.

HAL
For the 2014-15 in the INDIAN I-League season Hamza played for HAL SC who were based in Bangalore. After his maiden season with HAL, Hamza finished with 23 caps in the I-League and 9 goals and also for the 2015-16 I-League season Hamza played for HAL SC. After his maiden season with HAL, Hamza finished with 25 caps in the I-League and 12 goals.. Hamza left to Dubai in UAE and Play for "Al Hamriyah SC" a loan for 4 months and returned to India.

Salgaocar
After two season at HAL on 6 May 2016 it was announced that Hamza has signed with Salgaocar of the I-League for the 2017 I-League season.

Career statistics

Club
Statistics accurate as of 7 May 2015

References

External links
 goal.com profile

Nigerian footballers
AS Dragons FC de l'Ouémé players
1987 births
Living people
Al Hamriyah Club players
UAE First Division League players
I-League players
Place of birth missing (living people)
Association football forwards